Jdeide, also spelled Al Judaideh, or the New Fakehe, is a little village located in the northern part of the Baalbek District of Lebanon, on the main road between the city of Baalbek and the city of Hermel.
the population of Jdeide originates mainly from the nearby village of Fakeha which is located about one km of road in a valley of the mountain range of Anti-Lebanon.

Gallery

Beqaa Valley